The 14th Pan American Games were held in Santo Domingo, Dominican Republic from August 1 to August 17, 2003.

Medals

Silver

Women's Javelin: Laverne Eve 
Women's Long Jump: Jackie Edwards

Results by event

Athletics

Track

Field

Boxing

Swimming

Men's Competition

Women's Competition

References

See also
 Bahamas at the 2002 Central American and Caribbean Games
 Bahamas at the 2004 Summer Olympics

Nations at the 2003 Pan American Games
2003
Pan American Games